Norfolk county cricket teams were the teams that represented the historic county of Norfolk before the first official formation of Norfolk County Cricket Club in 1876.

18th century
Cricket had probably reached Norfolk by the end of the 17th century. The earliest known reference to cricket in Norfolk was in 1745. The first mention of a Norfolk representative team is in 1764, playing against Suffolk at Bury St Edmunds racecourse (today the location of Rougham Airfield) on 23 August. Norfolk won this match, which was reported in the Gazetteer & London Daily Advertiser on Tuesday, 28 August. Norfolk played two further matches against Suffolk on 10 and 12 September at Scole.

19th century
The first important Norfolk club of the 19th century was that based at Holt and an 1820 Norfolk v Marylebone Cricket Club (MCC) match, in which William Ward made a then-record score of 278, was in fact the Holt Club with E. H. Budd, Thomas Vigne and Felix Ladbroke as given men. This was perhaps a "borderline" match in terms of its status but, because of its historical importance in the light of Ward's record and the addition of the three given men, the standard was above the general run of Holt/Norfolk matches. The Holt club declined from the mid-1820s.

After that, the centre of county cricket was Norwich and a prominent club was founded there on 11 January 1827. For a few seasons, prior to Fuller Pilch's departure for Kent about 1835, Norfolk could put a fairly strong eleven into the field. Their only major county opponent, however, was Sheffield Cricket Club (playing as Yorkshire) and the five games they played in 1833, 1834 (twice), 1835 and 1836 are important.

Apart from the games against Yorkshire, the main opponents of the Norwich/Norfolk team were Bury/Suffolk and MCC. These games however were not quite in the class of the Yorkshire matches. Norfolk played Cambridge Town Club (a.k.a. Cambridgeshire) in the 1840s but Norfolk generally fared very poorly and by 1852 the team had lost important status. After the present Norfolk County Cricket Club was founded in 1876, the county did not regain important status and it joined the Minor Counties Championship when it was formed in 1895.

References

Bibliography

Further reading
 
 
 
 

History of Norfolk
English cricket in the 19th century
Former senior cricket clubs
Cricket in Norfolk